The Escambia waterdog (Necturus mounti) is a species of aquatic salamander in the family Proteidae. It is endemic to the southeastern United States.

Taxonomy 
It was formerly thought to be a lineage of the Gulf Coast waterdog (N. beyeri), but a 2020 analysis found sufficient morphological and genetic divergence for it to be considered its own species, and it was thus described as its own species, N. mounti (alongside the Apalachicola waterdog, N. moleri). The specific epithet honors American herpetologist Robert H. Mount.

Distribution 
It is found in southern Alabama and the Panhandle of Florida. It is found in the Blackwater, Escambia/Conecuh, Perdido, and Yellow river basins.

Description 
In contrast to N. beyeri, and much like N. moleri, it is small in size, weakly spotted, and has an unstriped larva that lacks the numerous white spots of N. beyeri.

References 

Proteidae
Amphibians of the United States
Endemic fauna of the United States
Amphibians described in 2020